Schmalkalden-Meiningen II is an electoral constituency (German: Wahlkreis) represented in the Landtag of Thuringia. It elects one member via first-past-the-post voting. Under the current constituency numbering system, it is designated as constituency 13. It covers the northern part of Schmalkalden-Meiningen.

Schmalkalden-Meiningen II was created for the 1994 state election. Since 2019, it has been represented by René Aust of Alternative for Germany (AfD).

Geography
As of the 2019 state election, Schmalkalden-Meiningen II covers the northern part of Schmalkalden-Meiningen, specifically the municipalities of Breitungen/Werra, Brotterode-Trusetal, Fambach, Floh-Seligenthal, Rosa, Roßdorf, Schmalkalden, and Steinbach-Hallenberg.

Members
The constituency was held by the Christian Democratic Union from its creation in 1994 until 2009, during which time it was represented by Andreas Trautvetter (1994–1999) and Jens Goebel (1999–2009). It was won by The Left in 2009, and was represented by Manfred Hellmann. The CDU's candidate Christina Liebetrau regained the constituency in 2014. It was won by Alternative for Germany in 2019, and is represented by René Aust.

Election results

2019 election

2014 election

2009 election

2004 election

1999 election

1994 election

Notes

References

Electoral districts in Thuringia
1994 establishments in Germany
Schmalkalden-Meiningen
Constituencies established in 1994